The  is a limited express train service in Japan connecting Kyoto, Shin-Osaka, Tennōji, Wakayama, Kii-Tanabe, Shirahama, and Shingu via the Tokaido Main Line (JR Kyoto Line), Osaka Loop Line, Hanwa Line, and Kisei Line (Kinokuni Line), operated by West Japan Railway Company (JR West). This article covers the derivative limited express trains, "" and "", the names of which were discontinued from start of the revised timetable on 17 March 2012.

Stops

Stations in parentheses are not served by all trains.

Trains stop at the following stations:

 –  –  – –  – – – –  –  – – – –  – –  –  –  –  –  –  –  – 

 Stations in brackets are stations where not all trains stop at.
 As trains go direct from the Loop Line to the Umeda Freight Line and Shin-Osaka, no trains go to Osaka Station. This changed on 13 February 2023 when trains started to route through new underground platforms at Osaka Station. The new platforms are expected to be open by 13 March 2023.

Rolling stock
 283 series EMUs
 287 series EMUs
 289 series EMUs (since 31 October 2015)

New 287 series EMUs were introduced on Kuroshio services from start of the revised timetable on 17 March 2012. From the same date, the Super Kuroshio and Ocean Arrow service names were discontinued, with services integrated with Kuroshio services.

New 289 series EMUs converted from former dual-voltage 683 series trainsets were introduced on Kuroshio services from 31 October 2015, replacing the last remaining JNR-era 381 series trains. The 289 series fleet consists of five six-car sets and three three-car sets (39 vehicles in total).

Former rolling stock
 381 series EMUs (October 1978 to 30 October 2015)

Formations
Green: Green car (first class)
White: Standard car (second class)
O: Observation car
G (green car), R (standard car): Reserved seats
NR (standard car only): Non-reserved seats
No smoking available.
Direction
left: Shirahama, Shingū
right: Shin-Osaka, Kyoto

The services are sometimes operated as 9-car formation between Kyoto and Shirahama.

Women-only seats are available in Car 5.

Women-only seats are available in Car 5.

See also
 List of named passenger trains of Japan

References

External links

 JR West 287 series Kuroshio 
 JR West 289 series Kuroshio 

West Japan Railway Company
Named passenger trains of Japan
Railway services introduced in 1965
1965 establishments in Japan